Chernorechensky is a rural locality (a khutor) in Beloprudskoye Rural Settlement, Danilovsky District, Volgograd Oblast, Russia. The population was 45 as of 2010.

Geography 
Chernorechensky is located in steppe, 51 km north of Danilovka (the district's administrative centre) by road. Belye Prudy is the nearest rural locality.

References 

Rural localities in Danilovsky District, Volgograd Oblast